The Ntsay government has governed Madagascar since 4 June 2018. It was formed by Prime Minister Christian Ntsay.

Ministers 

 Minister of National Defence: General of the Army Béni Xavier Rasolofonirina
 Minister of Foreign Affairs: Eloi Alphonse Maxime Dovo
 Keeper of the Seals, Minister of Justice: Mrs. Noro Vololona
 Minister of Finance and Budget: Ms. Sehenosoa Andriambololona
 Minister of the Interior and Decentralization: Tianarivelo Razafimahefa
 Minister of Public Security: Érick Michel Wouli Soumah Idrissa
 Minister of Economy and Planning: Marcel Arsonaivo Napetoke
 Minister of Territorial Development and Land Services: Ms. Christine Razanamahasoa
 Minister of Agriculture and Livestock and Fisheries: Harison Edmond Randriarimanana
 Minister of Mines and Petroleum: Henry Rabary-Njaka
 Minister of Fishery Resources and Fisheries: Augustin Andriamananoro
 Minister of Industry and Private Sector Development: Guy Rivo Randrianarisoa
 Minister of Commerce and Consumer Affairs: Mrs. Yvette Sylla
 Minister of Public Works and Infrastructure: Jacques Ulrich Andriantiana
 Minister of Transport and Meteorology: Beboarimisa Ralava
 Minister of Energy and Hydrocarbons: Lantoniaina Rasoloelison
 Minister of Public Health: Harinirina Yoël Honora Rantomalala
 Minister of National Education: Gatien Horace
 Minister of Public Service, Administration Reform, Labour, Employment and Social Laws: Holder Ramaholimasy
 Minister of Higher Education and Scientific Research: Mrs. Marie-Monique Rasoazananera
 Minister of Technical Education and Vocational Training: Ms. Lydia Aimée Vololona Rahantasoa
 Minister of Tourism: Jean Brunelle Razafintsiandraofa
 Minister of Water, Sanitation and Hygiene: Roland Ravatomanga
 Minister of the Environment, Ecology and Forests: Guillaume Venance Randriatefiarison
 Minister of Culture, Promotion of Handicrafts and Protection of Heritage: Ms. Eléonore Johasy
 Minister of Posts, Telecommunications and Digital Development: Jean de Dieu Maharante
 Minister of Communication and Relations with Institutions: Riana Andriamandavy VII
 Minister of Population, Social Protection and Promotion of Women: Mrs. Irmah Naharimamy
 Minister of Youth and Sports: Tsihoara Faratiana Eugène
 Secretary of State at the Ministry of National Defence in charge of the Gendarmerie: Major General Jean Christophe Randriamanarina, Serge Gellé

References

See also 

 Cabinet of Madagascar

Current governments
Government of Madagascar
2018 establishments in Madagascar
Cabinets established in 2018